Amiru Sanusi (born 2 February 1950) in Funtua, Katsina, Nigeria is a Nigerian jurist and former Justice of the Supreme Court of Nigeria. He was a judge in Katsina State between 1990 and 1998 before being commissioned to the Court of Appeal. Amiru Sanusi was sworn in by the former Chief Justice of Nigeria Justice Mahmud Mohammed in May 2015.

Sanusi has also be honoured with Officer of the Order of the Federal Republic. Sanusi is happily married with children, among his children is Ma'aruf Sanusi who is also a practicing lawyer.

References 

1950 births
Living people
Supreme Court of Nigeria justices